Labour for an Independent Wales is a group of Labour Party members who "believe the best way to achieve a democratic socialist Wales is through independence".

Background 
Labour for an Independent Wales held their first event with Neville Southall, at Welsh Labour Conference 2018. A second event took place at the 2019 Welsh Labour conference. The group formed a constitution in 2020. An executive committee was elected in 2021.

President of the group is Rachel Garrick.

Support for independence in Welsh Labour 
Elystan Morgan (1932-2021), a former Labour MP for Ceredigion and a life peer in the House of Lords, was a lifelong supporter of devolution and, following the Brexit vote, for dominion status for Wales.

Gwynoro Jones, a former Labour MP has argued for a constitutional convention that would explore a movement towards a sovereign Wales.

In August 2020, a YouGov poll showed that "if there was a referendum tomorrow", 39% of Welsh Labour voters would vote for independence with 37% against. The Welsh Governance Centre also found that at the time of the 2016 Senedd election, over 40% of Labour voters supported independence.

Blaenavon council, with a Labour majority, voted in to support independence.

In the 2021 Senedd election the co-founder of Labour for an Independent Wales, Ben Gwalchmai, was selected as the first openly pro-independence Welsh Labour Senedd candidate in the history of the Senedd; Dylan Lewis-Rowlands and then Cian Ireland were later selected as the second and third openly pro-independence Welsh Labour Senedd candidates. 

It has been suggested by Labour for an Independent Wales that Welsh Labour could support Welsh independence in the future.

Vision 
Labour for an independent Wales set out their answers to the public consultation of the Independent Commission on the Constitutional Future of Wales:

 "constitutional, environmental, legal, and social systems in place for a fair & sustainable country"
 "building a national framework fit for the 21st Century, containing all the constitutional,  environmental, legal, and social systems necessary for a fair & sustainable country"
 Oath of allegiance to the people of Wales, rather than the monarch and nationalising the crown estate of Wales
 To become an sovereign nation state with a Welsh central bank
 "putting people and the environment first, not profit"
 "changes to the constitution of Wales should be part of a nation-wide consultation"
 "Strengthening and developing the Welsh language"

See also 
 Plaid Cymru 
 List of movements in Wales

References 

Politics of Wales
Labour Party (UK)